ReLINE Software was a German game development company founded by Uwe Grabosch and Holger Gehrmann in Hannover in 1987.

The company acted first as a developer for Softgold, Rainbow Arts, Golden Games, Magic Bytes, micro-partner, and Robtek; the company later became significantly more independent and co-published games with Magic Byte.

Titles from the eighties include: Operation Hongkong, Drum Studio, Extensor, Hollywood Poker, Space Port, Amegas, Crystal Hammer, Hollywood Poker Pro, Black Gold (also known as Oil Imperium), Dyter-07, and Window Wizard (also known as Window Willy).

Games of the early nineties include Legend of Faerghail, Fate: Gates of Dawn and Centerbase.

Holger Gehrmann and Olaf Patzenhauer continued reLINE Software as a software label in 1993. The games Biing! and Biing! 2 originated from this time. However, the planned development of Oil Imperium 2 was cancelled.
 
ReLINE Software closed in 2004. In February 2008, Holger Gehrmann fell to his death from a seven-story office building months before his 40th birthday.  Olaf Patzenhauer died some time between late 2011 and mid-2012.

References 
 reLINE at The Hall of Light (HOL)

Defunct video game companies of Germany
Video game companies established in 1987
1987 establishments in West Germany
German companies established in 1987